Templeton is a census-designated place in Prince George County, Virginia. The population as of the 2010 Census was 431. Templeton is located along Interstate 95 at Exit 41 where US 301, and Virginia State Routes 35 and 156 converge.

References

Census-designated places in Prince George County, Virginia
Census-designated places in Virginia